Jolicure is a place about nine kilometres northeast of Sackville, New Brunswick, Canada on Route 16.

History

See also
List of communities in New Brunswick

Communities in Westmorland County, New Brunswick